1929 Canadian Challenge Trophy was an interprovincial soccer competition for the Canadian National Challenge Cup.

BC/Alberta Final
Edmonton C.N.R. defeated Vancouver St. Saviours

Western Final
Winnipeg United Weston defeated Edmonton C.N.R. in three games.

Canadian Final

References

1929
Canadian Challenge Trophy
Challenge Trophy